Stórsveit Nix Noltes are an Icelandic post-rock and Balkan folk band formed in 2004 and composed mostly of members of other Icelandic bands such as múm and Benni Hemm Hemm. Their first album, Orkideur Hawai was nominated as indie album of the year in the Icelandic Music Awards.

Discography
 Orkideur Hawai (March 21, 2006, Bubblecore)
 Royal Family - Divorce (May 5, 2009, FatCat Records/Rough Trade)

References

External links
 Official MySpace

Musical groups established in 2004
Icelandic post-rock groups
FatCat Records artists
Musical groups from Reykjavík